Seven is a 1979 American action film directed by Andy Sidaris and starring William Smith as Drew Sevano, a freelance agent hired by the government to eliminate a cartel of seven mobsters attempting to take over Hawaii. To help him accomplish this, Drew recruits a team of seven individual operatives with their own special talents.

Cast
William Smith as Drew
Barbara Leigh as Alexa
Guich Koock as The Cowboy
Christipher Joy as T. K.
Art Metrano as Kinsella
Ed Parker as himself
Richard LePore as The Professor
Reggie Nalder as The Hermit
Seth Sakai as Keoki McDowell
Kwan Hi Lim as Mr. Chen
Tino Tuiolosega as Mr. Lee
Lenny Montana as The Kahuna
Martin Kove as Skip
Susan Kiger as Jennie
Peter Knecht as Kimo Maderos
Terry Kiser as Senator
Nicholas Georgiade as Niko
Tadashi Yamashita as Swordsman
Andy Sidaris as White Hat Man

Production
Seven was filmed at Oahu and Kauai in Hawaii. Robert Baird, who is credited along with William Driskill as screenwriter, is a pseudonym for writer and photographer William Edgar. The Hollywood Reporter budgeted the film at $2 million and noted that the film had "just completed" in their February 7, 1979 article.

Release
Seven was released in the United States on September 21, 1979, where it premiered in Los Angeles. The film distributed by American International.

Reception
Variety stated that Seven is "filled with stock Hawaiian footage, and not very good stuff at that. Pic lags continually, which won't pacify the action audience." The review also noted that "product plugs are also heavy-handed, and enumerated again with a final credit." The Monthly Film Bulletin stated that the film was "rendered thoroughly mechanical by the laborious business of pairing off its seven hit men with their seven underworld targets. The film's trite efforts to make an impression with its bizarre methods of execution-by hang-glider, lasergun and inflatable sex doll-do little to offset the interminable exposition."

Notes

References

External links
Seven at TCMDB

1979 films
1979 action films
Films directed by Andy Sidaris
American action films
1970s English-language films
1970s American films